The Walking Horse and Eastern Railroad  is a  short-line railroad that connects Shelbyville to CSX Transportation at Wartrace, Tennessee, United States. It operates over a branch line completed in 1853 by the Nashville and Chattanooga Railroad, a Louisville and Nashville Railroad predecessor. After the Seaboard System Railroad abandoned the line in May 1985, the Bedford Railroad Authority (of Bedford County) bought the line and designated the WHOE to operate it.

References

Tennessee railroads
Railway companies established in 1985
Spin-offs of CSX Transportation